Dirgėla is the masculine form of a Lithuanian family name. Its feminine forms  are: Dirgėlienė (married woman or widow) and Dirgėlaitė (unmarried woman).

The surname may refer to:

Kęstutis Dirgėla – Lithuanian engineer, politician
Petras Dirgėla – Lithuanian writer
Povilas Dirgėla – Lithuanian writer

Lithuanian-language surnames